Gomphoneis is a genus of diatoms in the family Gomphonemataceae.

References

 
 
 Gomphoneis at WoRMS

Cymbellales
Diatom genera